Pablo Simonet (born 4 May 1992) is an Argentine handball player for Benidorm and the Argentina men's national handball team.

He defended Argentina at the 2015 World Men's Handball Championship in Qatar.

Two of his brothers, Sebastian and Diego, defended Argentina at the Olympics and World Championships competitions in handball.

References

External links

1992 births
Living people
Argentine male handball players
Argentine people of French descent
Handball players at the 2016 Summer Olympics
Olympic handball players of Argentina
Handball players at the 2015 Pan American Games
Handball players at the 2019 Pan American Games
Pan American Games medalists in handball
Pan American Games gold medalists for Argentina
Pan American Games silver medalists for Argentina
Expatriate handball players
Argentine expatriate sportspeople in France
Argentine expatriate sportspeople in Spain
South American Games silver medalists for Argentina
South American Games medalists in handball
Competitors at the 2018 South American Games
Medalists at the 2015 Pan American Games
Medalists at the 2019 Pan American Games
Handball players at the 2020 Summer Olympics
People from Vicente López Partido
Sportspeople from Buenos Aires Province
21st-century Argentine people